Ibrahim Sabir Marzouq Al-Mukhaini (born 16 April 1987), commonly known as Ibrahim Al-Mukhaini, is an Omani who plays for Sur SC.

Club career statistics

International career
Ibrahim was selected for the national team for the first time in 2008. He made his first appearance for Oman on 26 March 2008 in a 2010 FIFA World Cup qualification match against Thailand.

References

External links
 
 Ibrahim Al-Mukhaini at Goal.com
 

1987 births
Living people
Omani footballers
Oman international footballers
Association football defenders
Sur SC players
Al-Shabab SC (Seeb) players
Oman Professional League players